Near Sawrey and Far Sawrey are two neighbouring villages in the Furness area of Cumbria, England. They are located in the Lake District between the village of Hawkshead and the lake of Windermere. The two lie on the B5285, which runs from Hawkshead to the west bank of the Windermere Ferry, a car ferry across Windermere  to the east of the villages.

The two are famous for their association with Beatrix Potter. She lived at Hill Top Farm in Near Sawrey, first arriving at age 30 in 1896. A number of sites in the villages were used in her books such as The Tale of Tom Kitten, The Fairy Caravan, The Pie and the Patty Pan and The Tale of Jemima Puddle-Duck.

The villages date from at least the 14th century, when Near Sawrey was known as 'Sourer', becoming 'Narr Sawrey' by the 17th century (suggesting that Far Sawrey must have been in existence by that time). Near Sawrey contains a pub, while Far Sawrey has the parish church, a hotel and pub. The village shop ceased to function as a post office around 2003 and ceased to be a shop around 2010.

There are waymarked paths between the ferry and Beatrix Potter's house, which mostly allows people to avoid walking on the public roads.

See also

Listed buildings in Claife

References

External links

 Cumbria County History Trust: Claife (nb: provisional research only – see Talk page)
 Near Sawrey at the Cumbria Directory
 Far Sawrey at the Cumbria Directory
 Streaming web cam of Windermere from Far Sawrey slip

Villages in Cumbria
South Lakeland District
Beatrix Potter